Mysteries at the Monument (formerly Monumental Mysteries)  is an American reality television series currently airing on the Travel Channel and is hosted by Don Wildman. The show uncovers stories of history and unsolved mysteries behind America's national monuments. The series premiered on May 9, 2013, at 9:00 p.m. EST. The second season aired on June 13, 2014, at 9:00 p.m. EST. For Season 3, which premiered July 3, 2015, the series was renamed.

Premise
Host Don Wildman travels the country for America's most amazing and unusual national monuments, uncovering the histories and mysteries hidden within. Each episode features a monument, historical marker, landmark, sculpture, or statue that has a special story or unique secret about them.

Opening Introduction: (narrated by Don Wildman):

Season 1-2: 

Season 3:

Special (2012)

Note: Monumental Mysteries: A Mystery at the Museum Special aired on July 17, 2012, as a special episode apart of the related Travel Channel Mysteries at the Museum series. The special also served as a spin-off episode for the first-season premiere of Monumental Mysteries in 2013. It's also called Mysteries at the Museum: Monumental Mysteries Special.

Series overview

Episodes

Season 1 (2013)

Season 2 (2014)

Season 3 (2015)

References

External links
 
 
 

Travel Channel original programming
2010s American documentary television series
2013 American television series debuts
American non-fiction television series
Television series featuring reenactments
2016 American television series endings